Madeleine of France, also called Magdalena of Valois (1 December 1443 – 21 January 1495), was a French princess who became Princess of Viana by marriage to Gaston of Foix. She was the regent of Navarre between 1479 and 1494 during the minority of her two children, each of whom became monarchs of Navarre: Francis I and Catherine I.

Life
She was born at Tours, a younger daughter of Charles VII of France and Marie of Anjou.

Magdalena was betrothed to Ladislaus the Posthumous, but he died suddenly in Prague on 23 November 1457 while preparing for his marriage. It was rumored at the time that his political opponents in Bohemia had poisoned him; but in the 20th century it was proved that Ladislaus died of leukemia, not a recognized disease in that period.

She instead married Gaston, Prince of Viana, son and heir of Gaston IV of Foix and Eleanor of Navarre, at Saint-Jean-d'Angély in 1461.

Regent of Navarre

Her husband died in 1470, predeceasing his father; accordingly, when Gaston IV died in 1472, his possessions were inherited by Magdalena's son, Francis Phoebus. Francis became the heir of Navarre in 1479 upon the death of his great-grandfather, John II of Aragon and Navarre, who left Navarre to the rightful heir, Magdalena's mother-in-law, Eleanor. Eleanor only spent a few weeks as queen before she herself died.

Francis Phoebus became king, and his mother acted as regent until his death, at age 17, in 1483. Magdalena continued her regency, then for her daughter, Catherine, until 1494. During this regency, she was forced to battle her brother-in-law, John of Foix, who claimed the throne of Navarre as heir male of Francis Phoebus.

In 1483, she arranged for her daughter to be married to a French nobleman on the suggestion of the King of France and refused the match with the heir to the throne of Castile and Aragon, in order to protect Navarre from being united with Castile and Aragon by a French alliance.  The marital contract was signed in 1484 and the wedding of her daughter took place in 1486.  Her daughter's marriage does not to have been consummated until 1491.  It is possible that the consummation, being a political event, was purposely postponed in order to prevent Catherine and her husband being declared of legal majority, which would allow Magdalena to continue her regency.  Magdalena continued to act as regent despite the fact that her daughter had given birth in 1491 and her marriage had clearly been consummated and, at the age of twenty-three, should no longer have the need of a minor regency.  Her continued regency even after her daughter's coronation in 1494 is clearly evidenced, as it is documented that she continued to sign charters and be mentioned first officially as regent despite her daughter and son-in-law being adults.

Magdalena was taken hostage by Ferdinand II of Aragon in 1494. This ended her regency of Navarre and her daughter and son-in-law are confirmed to have been active rulers from this time onward. She died in the following year at Pamplona; her death provoked fresh conflict.

With the death of Charles VIII of France (Magdalena's nephew), the descendants of Charles VI of France ceased to occupy the French throne. By the death of Anne of France, Magdalena's niece, along with that of her elder sister Yolande, Duchess of Savoy, became the last surviving legitimate descents from Charles VII of France. Her descendant and heir, Henry III of Navarre, would become King of France in 1589, returning the descent and heirs of Charles VI and Charles VII to the French throne.

Issue
She had two children:

Francis Phoebus (1466–1483), King of Navarre
Catherine (1470–1517), queen regnant of Navarre, married in 1484 John of Albret (1469–1516).

Ancestry

References

1443 births
1495 deaths
People from Tours, France
House of Valois
Regents of France
15th-century women rulers
15th-century viceregal rulers
Princesses of Viana
Burials at Pamplona Cathedral
15th-century French people
15th-century French women
Daughters of kings
15th-century Navarrese monarchs